The 2015 United States Mixed Doubles Curling Championship was held from December 3-7, 2014 at the Eau Claire Curling Club in Eau Claire, Wisconsin. Sarah Anderson and Korey Dropkin won the tournament, earning the right to represent the United States at the 2015 World Mixed Doubles Curling Championship in Sochi, Russia.

Teams 
Twenty three teams qualified to compete in the championship.

Round robin

Standings

Tiebreaker
Saturday, December 6, 5:00pm CT

Playoffs

Bracket

Quarterfinals
Saturday, December 6, 8:00pm

Semifinals
Sunday, December 7, 11:00am CT

Final
Sunday, December 7, 2:00pm CT

References 

United States National Curling Championships
Curling in Wisconsin
United States Mixed Doubles Championship
United States Mixed Doubles Curling Championship
Sports competitions in Wisconsin
Sports in Eau Claire, Wisconsin
United States Mixed Doubles Curling Championship
United States